Ernest Crutchlow (born 6 November 1948) is a British former international cyclist.

Career
He competed in the sprint event at the 1972 Summer Olympics.

He represented England in the 1,000 metres match sprint, at the 1970 British Commonwealth Games in Edinburgh, Scotland. Four years later he competed in the match sprint once again and the tandem (in which he won a gold medal) at the 1974 British Commonwealth Games in Christchurch, New Zealand.

He was the British National sprint champion in 1970, 1971, 1972 and 1973 (amateurs) and 1980 (profs). Crutchlow also won the City of Manchester Grand Prix in 1973.

References

External links
 

1948 births
Living people
British male cyclists
Olympic cyclists of Great Britain
Cyclists at the 1972 Summer Olympics
Sportspeople from Nuneaton
Commonwealth Games medallists in cycling
Commonwealth Games gold medallists for England
Cyclists at the 1970 British Commonwealth Games
Cyclists at the 1974 British Commonwealth Games
Medallists at the 1974 British Commonwealth Games